Samuel Chase, an associate justice of the Supreme Court of the United States, was impeached by the United States House of Representatives on March 12, 1804 on eight articles of impeachment alleging misconduct. His impeachment trial before the United States Senate delivered an acquittal on March 1, 1805, with none of the eight articles receiving the two-thirds majority needed for a conviction. 

The impeachment was a partisan affair. It was an effort by the Thomas Jefferson-led Democratic–Republican Party to weaken a judiciary that had been largely shaped by the opposing Federalist Party. The outcomes help solidify norms of an independent judiciary and impeachments requiring more than just a disagreement between an official and the Congress.

Chase is the only United States Supreme Court justice to have ever been impeached.

Background

The impeachment of Samuel Chase, an associate justice of the United States Supreme Court, was politically motivated. A high-profile affair at the time,
the impeachment pitted the two major United States political parties of the era against each other amid a battle between the parties over, among other things, what the role of Federal courts should look like. The era preceding the impeachment had seen heated political battle between the Federalists, led by John Adams, and the Democratic–Republicans, led by Thomas Jefferson. The Supreme Court of the United States was regarded at the time to be strongly partisan to the Federalist Party. The impeachment was in large part a reaction to this lean of the Supreme Court. Associate Justice Chase was viewed to be the most partisan justice on the Supreme Court. He was a strong Federalist and publicly made known his opposition to President Thomas Jefferson. He had campaigned for Federalist incumbent John Adams during the 1800 presidential election.

The impeachment was also, in part, a reaction to the increase in the power of the Supreme Court in the previous years under Chief Justice John Marshall, including the landmark Marbury v. Madison decision. Democratic–Republicans saw the judiciary, and especially the Supreme Court, as an obstacle to their consolidation of power in government. When Jefferson took office, all six Supreme Court justices were Federalists, and by 1804, Jefferson had only gotten the chance to make a single appointment to fill a Supreme Court vacancy. President Jefferson, alarmed at the seizure of power by the judiciary through their claim of exclusive judicial review in Marbury v. Madison, led his party's efforts to remove the Federalists from the bench. When Thomas Jefferson took office as president in 1801, after defeating Federalist incumbent president John Adams in the 1800 presidential election, he became impatient with the independence of the judiciary. He believed that Congress or the executive should have more sway over federal judges, and believed that their appointment and removal should be more routine along the lines of other appointed public officers. The 1800 United States elections had not only seen Jefferson unseat Adams, but had also seen the Democratic–Republicans capture control of both chambers of the United States Congress in what Jefferson referred to as the "Revolution of 1800". The party had won a sizable enough number of seats in the chambers of the legislature to make the party hypothetically capable of impeaching and removing a federal official with only the votes of its own members.

Jefferson's allies in Congress had, shortly after his inauguration, repealed the Judiciary Act of 1801, abolishing the lower courts created by the legislation and terminating their Federalist judges despite lifetime appointments. In May 1803, two years after this repeal, Chase denounced it in his charge to a Baltimore grand jury, saying that it would "take away all security for property and personal liberty, and our Republican constitution will sink into a mobocracy." This would play a role in the impeachment charges, along with several events from 1800. The first event from 1800 was that Chase, in April 1800 while acting as a district judge, made strong attacks upon Thomas Cooper, who had been indicted under the Alien and Sedition Acts; Chase had taken the air of a prosecutor rather than a judge. This conduct angered Democratic–Republicans. His conduct soon after in the trial of John Fries further angered Democratic–Republicans. Even more angering was his conduct in the May 1800 trial of James T. Callender. Later in 1800, when a grand jury in New Castle, Delaware declined to indict a local printer, Chase refused to discharge them, saying he was aware of one specific printer whom he wished them to indict for seditious behavior. Jefferson saw the attack as indubitable bad behavior and an opportunity to reduce the Federalist influence on the judiciary by impeaching Chase, helping prompt the House's consideration of impeaching Chase two weeks later when he wrote to Congressman Joseph Hopper Nicholson of Maryland, asking: "Ought the seditious and official attack [by Chase] on the principles of our Constitution . . .to go unpunished?"

In 1803, Federal District Judge John Pickering, whose mental state had declined, was impeached and removed on charges of habitual drunkenness. Pickering was only the second official to be impeached by the United States House of Representatives, and was the first official to be thereafter removed after a trial by the United States Senate. This successful removal of a judge from office through impeachment emboldened many in Congress to use the tool of impeachment as a means of pushing the Supreme Court towards subservience. Similarly encouraging was the removal of Pennsylvania judge Alexander Addison through an impeachment by that state's legislature. The resolution that officially impeached Chase was adopted by the House of Representatives only an hour after Pickering was convicted in his impeachment trial on March 12, 1804. Democratic–Republicans took a broad view of what impeachment could be used for. They effectively believed that the Congress could use impeachment to remove judges whose opinions were disfavored by more than one-third of senators, viewing this as a means of keeping judges in line with the sentiments of "the people".

Impeachment in the House of Representatives

Vote to launch impeachment inquiry
An impeachment inquiry was launched against Chase led by the special committee appointed "to inquire into the official conduct of Samuel Chase, one of the associate Justices of the Supreme Court of the United States, and of Richard Peters, district judge of the district judge of the district of Pennsylvania". The resolution to appoint a special committee to investigate Chase was introduced to the House by John Randolph of Roanoke on January 5, 1804. On January 6, 1804, an investigation of Judge Richard Peters of the District of Pennsylvania was added, by amendment, to the proposed resolution for the special committee in a 79–37 vote of the House. The amended resolution was adopted by the House on January 7, 1804 in an 81–40 vote.

Early inquiry developments
The Congressmen appointed to the special committee to run the inquiry were John Boyle, Joseph Clay, Peter Early, Roger Griswold, Benjamin Huger, Joseph Hopper Nicholson, John Randolph of Roanoke.

On January 10, 1804, the House authorized the special committee to send for people, papers, and records. On January 30, 1804, the House authorized them to print any documents and papers that they deemed to be necessary.

Adoption of impeachment resolution
The special committee running the impeachment inquiry submitted a report to the House on March 6, 1804 recommending the impeachment of Chase along with an impeachment resolution. On March 12, 1804, the special committee formally presented its report on its investigations to the full House. The reported read,

The committee had also created a great number of printed documents that outlined a number of testimonies and depositions taken both by the committee itself and by others.

On March 12, 1804, after the special committee reported to the House, the House proceeded without debate to vote on the impeachment resolution. The House voted 73–32 to adopt the resolution to impeach Chase. This marked the third time that the United States House of Representatives had voted to practice its power to impeach a federal civil officer, with the two previous incidents being the 1797 impeachment of William Blount (which saw the United States Senate vote to dismiss the charges due to questions over whether members of the United States Congress were actually constitutionally subject to its own impeachment powers) and the 1803 impeachment of New Hampshire federal district court judge John Pickering. The vote to adopt the impeachment resolution, incidentally, came only one hour after the Senate voted to convict Pickering in Pickering's impeachment trial.

The impeachment resolution read:

After the adoption of the resolution, Congressmen John Randolph of Roanoke and Peter Early were appointed to a committee to go before the Senate and inform them of the impeachment vote. On March 14, 1804, the House received a message from the Senate that the Senate would take proper order on impeachment.

Subsequent months of inquiry
The period after the impeachment resolution was passed saw months of continued impeachment inquiry investigating the activities of Chase along with a months-long effort by the Democratic–Republicans to shape public opinion in favor of removing Chase. It would only be eleven months after the inquiry originally began in January that articles of impeachment were adopted.

Adoption of articles of impeachment
In early United States federal impeachments, it was practice to first pass a general impeachment resolution, and only afterwards adopt articles of impeachment outlining specific charges. This differs from modern United States federal impeachment practices, however.

On March 13, 1804, a special committee was appointed to draw up article of impeachment against Chase. Appointed to the committee were Congressmen John Boyle, Joseph Clay, Peter Early, Joseph Hopper Nicholson, and John Randolph of Roanoke. Seven articles of impeachment were reported to the House on March 26, 1804, but were ordered to lie on the table and no action was taken on them before the congress entered a recess. On November 6, 1804, the articles were referred to a special committee consisting of Congressmen Joseph Clay, Peter Early, and John Randolph of Roanoke, and John Rhea.

On November 30, 1804, at the end of impeachment inquiry activities, Congressman Randolph reported eight articles of impeachment to the House. On December 4, 1804, the House of Representatives held votes to adopt the eight articles of impeachment.

All the counts involved Chase's work as a trial judge in lower circuit courts. In that day, Supreme Court justices had the added duty of individually serving on circuit courts. The Supreme Court's justices would only spend a small fraction of their time meeting together as appellate judges in Washington, D.C. The bulk of their time was spend acting as circuit judges in separate geographic areas of the United States. In this role they would serve in tandem with a federal district judge permanently assigned to that area's court. The Supreme Court's judges were not fond of the arrangement that saw them tasked with these circuit court duties. The heart of the allegations made against Chase was that political bias had led Chase to treat defendants and their counsel in a blatantly unfair manner.

Despite the Democratic–Republican theory that impeachment did not require a criminal act, many of the articles focused on acts that were dubiously alleged to be criminal. It is unclear the exact reason that these charges were included among the articles of impeachment, but one theory is that John Randolph of Roanoke was interested in proving criminality on Chase's part, regardless of his own theory of impeachment not requiring criminality.

The order of the articles of impeachment placed the offending events in chronological order.

Article I
The first article of impeachment charged Chase of acting improperly during the circuit court treason trial of John Fries in 1800, accusing Chase of having failed to act as an impartial judge and instead having acted, "in a manner high arbitrary, oppressive, and unjust". The article accused Chase of being biased against Fries' defense.

Three examples of Chase's alleged lack of impartiality were cited in the article. The first example claimed that Chase had delivered a written opinion on the matter of law upon which the defense of Fries materially rested before his defense counsel had been able to speak before the jury, thereby prejudicing the jury against Fries' defense. The second example claimed that Chase had restricted Fries' defense counsel from citing a number of English legal authorities and a number of United States statutes that they had held would be illustrative of the positions they were outlining in their defense. The third exampled claimed that he had debarred Fries from, "his constitutional privilege of addressing the jury (through his counsel) on the law, as well on the fact, which, was to determine his guilt or innocence, and at the same time endeavoring to wrest from the jury their indisputable right to hear argument and determine upon the question of law, as well as the question of fact, involved in the verdict which they were required to give".

The article was adopted by a vote of 82–34.

Article II
The second article accused Chase of acting improperly in the May 1800 trial in which James T. Callender was charged under the Alien and Sedition Act with seditious libel against President John Adams by ruling against the request of a jury member, John Basset, to be excused from serving due to having already reached a personal judgement on the case before the trial. The article was adopted by a vote of 83–35.

Article III
The third article accused Chase of misconduct in the James T. Callender trial by refusing to permit John Taylor to testify as a material witness on behalf of Callender. The article was adopted by a vote of 83–34.

Article IV
The fourth article related to the conduct of Chase during the Callender trial, accusing him of conduct that was marked by "manifest injustice, partiality, and intemperance." The article cited several examples. The article was adopted by a vote of 84–34.

Article V
The fifth article alleged that his issuing of a warrant instead of a summons during the Callender trial was not in keeping with the statutory language of "An act to establish the judicial courts of the United States". No evil intent was alleged, with the article effectively arguing that an error could constitute an impeachable offense. The article was adopted by a vote of 70–45.

Article VI
The sixth article alleged that his refusal of a continuance during the Callender trial was not in keeping with the statutory language of "An act to establish the judicial courts of the United States". The article was adopted by a vote of 73–42.

Article VII
The seventh article dealt with Chase's conduct at the New Castle, Delaware grand jury. The article was adopted by a vote of 73–38.

Article VIII
The eighth article dealt with Chase's conduct at the Baltimore grand jury. It accused Chase of being, "highly indecent, extra-judcial," and also accused him of, "tending to prostitute the high judicial character with which he was invested, to the low purpose of an electioneering partizan." The article, arguably, was most reflective of the primary motivation for the impeachment: the view that Chase was a partisan Federalist. The first section of the article, outlining the charges, was adopted by a vote of 74–39. A second segment of the article, which outlined some general aspects of the impeachment process and preparation for trial, was adopted by a separate vote of 78–32.

Vote overview

Appointment of House managers

After adopting the eight articles of impeachment, the House considered a motion to appoint by ballot the House managers that would act as the prosecution in the impeachment trial before the Senate. However, a vote on this motion was postponed until the following day. On December 5, 1804, the House approved the motion and voted by ballot to appoint seven house managers. On the first ballot, six individuals met the required majority of votes to be selected as managers (John Boyle, Peter Early, Roger Nelson, Joseph Hopper Nicholson, John Randolph of Roanoke, and Caesar Augustus Rodney). Thereafter, a second ballot was held to fill the final slot. Nobody received the needed majority in this round. Speaker Nathaniel Macon opined that, per a House standing rule related to such a situation on a second ballot that he believed was applicable, the individual with the greatest plurality should be considered duly elected. As George W. Campbell had the greatest plurality on the second ballot, it was Speaker Macon's opinion that Campbell was therefore duly elected the seventh impeachment manager. However, two congressmen appealed the speaker's decision, and the House voted that the Speaker Macon's decision not to be "in order". Therefore, a third ballot was held. On with ballot, Campbell received the required majority of the vote, and was therefore elected as the seventh manager. All seven members individuals were members of the Democratic–Republican party. After the election of the impeachment managers, the House approved a motion ordering for the managers to bring the articles before the Senate. After this, a motion was approved ordering for a message to be sent by the clerk of the United States House of Representatives to the Senate to notify them that the House had appointed the impeachment managers and had directed them to carry the articles to the Senate. On December 6, 1804, Roger Nelson declined his appointment to be an impeachment manager, as he would have to absent from Washington, D.C. during the trial. Nelson was replaced with Christopher H. Clark.

John Randolph of Roanoke served as the chairman and main spokesman of the impeachment managers.

Senate trial

The Senate was controlled by Jeffersonian Democratic-Republicans at the time of the trial. With a 25–9 majority, they the party had a two-thirds supermajority hypothetically capable of securing Chase's conviction in even a party-line vote.

Officers of the trial
Vice President Aaron Burr served as the presiding officer of the trial. At the time he had outstanding murder charges against him in two states resulting from his fatal shooting of Alexander Hamilton during the Burr–Hamilton duel. Presiding over the impeachment trial was among the last official duty Burr undertook as vice president, along with presiding over the certification of the Electoral College vote for the 1804 presidential election on February 13, 1805, in the middle of the impeachment trial. He would give his vice-presidential farewell speech to the Senate the day after the trial ended.

As the trial approached, perhaps to influence how Burr would conduct the trial, Jefferson began to give Burr increased attention. Burr received several invites to dine at the President's House (White House) Appointed to important offices in the Louisiana Territory newly-established government were Burr's stepson, Burr's brother-in-law, and Burr's close friend James Wilkinson. On a similar note, Senator William Branch Giles, a chief proponent of impeaching and removing Chase, distributed a petition urging Governor George Clinton of New York to see that the murder indictment against Burr be withdrawn. Many Democratic–Republican senators obliged to sign this petition. In his book Grand Inquests, William Rehnquist opined that he saw no historical evidence that Burr was persuaded by these overtures. Burr was highly praised for his performance as the presiding officer of the trial. However, some senators were discontent with how how acted as presiding officer, with William Plumer writing in his daily diary, "Mr. Burr is remarkably testy—he acts more of the tyrant—is impatient, passionate—scolds—he is in a rage because we do not sit longer."

The impeachment managers served as the prosecutors.

Chase was defended by his counsel: Robert Goodloe Harper, Joseph Hopkinson, Charles Lee Philip Barton Key, and Luther Martin. Martin ultimately took a leading role in the defense.

Rules of the trial
On November 30, 1804, in preparation for the trial, the Senate appointed Senators Abraham Baldwin, John Breckenridge, William Branch Giles, Israel Smith, and David Stone to serve on a special committee tasked with creating rules of proceedings for the Senate to use in the trial. On December 7, 1804, the rules created by this committee were reported back to the full Senate.

Nineteen rules were adopted for the trial. The rules were formally adopted by the Senate on December 24 and 31, 1804. These rules appear to have also been used for the later impeachment trials of James H. Peck and West Hughes Humphreys. After this, new rules were created ahead of the impeachment trial of Andrew Johnson. Johnson's impeachment trial could not use the rules created for Chase's impeachment, as those rules used wording specific to a trial being presided over by an officer of the Senate, while the Constitution stipulates that impeachments trials for incumbent presidents are presided over by the chief justice of the United States. However, the rules adopted for Johnson's impeachment trial were in part adapted from the rules of Chase's and earlier impeachment trials.

Start of the proceedings
The Senate first began impeachment trial proceedings on December 7, 1807. The articles of impeachment were carried the Senate Chamber where they were read. A summons was then issued for Justice Chase, to be returned on January 2, 1805, at which point the Justice was to answer the charges. At approximately 2pm on January 3, 1805, the court was opened by proclamation. An oath was administered to Vice President Burr. Burr then administered an oath to the senators. This was with the exception of Senators George Logan, Samuel Maclay, and William Plumer who were instead administered an affirmation. This was also with the exception of Senators James A. Bayard, William Cocke, John Gaillard, and David Stone, who were not present. No members of the House of Representatives were present on this day, including the absence of the House impeachment managers. Vice President Burr, as presiding officer, declared that he had received a letter from the defended which contained an affidavit attesting that he needed further time to prepare for the trial. The affidavit was then read. The Senate then voted to extend the date by which they were to receive an answer and proceed with the trial to February 4, 1805 and to notify the House of Representatives and Samuel Chase of this extension.

Decoration of the Senate Chamber
Before the start of the pleading phase, Vice President Burr had had the Senate chamber decorated for the trial in what was described by reporters Thomas Lloyd and Samuel Harrison Smith as "a style of appropriate elegance". A semi-circular gallery was constructed in the chamber for the trial, which one Federalist senator likened to a "Roman amphitheater." Lloyd and Harrison described the arrangement of the Senate Chamber for the trial as follows, 

The thirty-four senators sat in two rows of crimson-cloth covered benches, oriented to look towards the galleries and the area set aside for the defense and prosecution. The temporary gallery that had been erected for use by female spectators contained three rows of green cloth-covered seats. The defense and prosecution were seated in separate boxes facing the bar of the Senate containing blue cloth-covered seats.

Pleading phase
On February 4, 1805, at approximately 9:45am, the court was opened by proclamation with all members of the Senate in attendance and with Vice President Burr presiding. The Senate Chamber was filled with spectators. Oaths were administered to Senators Bayard, Cocke, Gaillard, and Stone, all who had not been present when oaths were previously administered to senators. It was then ordered that the secretary of the United States Senate give notice to the House that the Senate was convened in their public chamber, prepared to proceed with the trial, and that seats were provided in the chamber for the accommodation of the House's members. The House impeachment managers, several minutes later, accompanied by other members of the House entered the chamber to take their seats. Chase and his legal counsel then appeared. Chase moved for permission to read his answer to the impeachment court, and the Senate agreed by a vote to allow him to. Chase then proceeded to read his answer. Chase's response was more than 100 pages. He read it for a length reported to be either two and one-half hours or three and a half hours. 

Originally, when Chase had entered the chamber's box, the sergeant at arms of the United States Senate brought a chair to Chase. However, Burr ordered that this chair be removed, believing that the chamber should mimic the English criminal trial practice in which prisoners were made to stand "in the dock". Chase, however, asked to be allowed to use a chair due to his ill health. Chase was sixty-four years old and suffered from gout. After this request was made, Burr allowed for a chair to be provided for Chase to use.

In his answer, Chase denied having committed any crime or misdemeanor. Chase addressed the charges, explaining his conduct in the Fries and Callender trials and the New Castle grand jury. For example, in response to the third article, he argued that John Taylor's testimony, "was inconclusive, immaterial, and inadmissible." He also argued that errors in rulings were not a grounds for removal from office. He outright refuted the eighth charge. In response to the Baltimore grand jury-related allegations, he argued that making a mistake in political expression should not be criminalized, remarking that otherwise, "a party in power, under this pretext, [might] destroy any judge who might happen...to say something capable of being construed by them into a political opinion adverse to their own system."

After Chase's answer was read, Randolph requested for the House managers be given time to prepare a response, which was delivered days later on February 9, 1805.

Argument phase
In the argument phase, the two sides called many witnesses, with 52 in total providing testimony. The trial was suspended on February 13 so that the certification of the Electoral College vote of the 1804 presidential election, in which Jefferson was reelected, could be held. Chase was not subject to any direct questioning during the argument phase.

Prosecution's presentation
The argument phase of the trial began on February 9, 1805. The prosecution went first, giving their presentation over five days. 18 witnesses were brought to the stand to provide sworn testimony about Chase's conduct related to the articles of impeachment. The case presented by the prosecution was twofold. They argued that impeachment was a process through which the Senate was allowed to remove officers such as Chase at their own prerogative, and no grounds were therefore required to be proven in the impeachment trial. They alternatively, for those unconvinced by this, presented other argument aimed at proving that Chase had committed content that constituted a high crime or misdemeanor worthy of removal from office. 

Peter Early provided the opening remarks of the prosecution's presentation. This was followed by a lengthy and detailed presentation by George W. Campbell espousing a Jeffersonian perspective on federal impeachment. Campbell argued,

Campbell then outlined the actions of Chase in question in the trial, giving particularly focus on his conduct during the Callander trial. Campbell's remarks stretched over two days. His speech has been described as "dull and confused", and the Senate Chamber was sparsely attended by spectators during his remarks. In the early part of the prosecution's presentation, both Early and Campbell each gave remarks that addressed several of the articles of impeachment. Early's remarks, however, largely summarized the testimony of the prosecution's witnesses. Early alleged that the only conclusion one could reasonably draw from Chase's judicial errors, given Chase's high education, was that he had permitted a personal "thirst for punishment" to get in the way of impartial justice. Early also declared, "[S]urely we shall not be asked for proofs of corrupt intent...in such a case as the one now under consideration, the answer is that the criminal intent is apparent upon the face of the act." Campbell discussed the legal theories championed by the prosecution and also argued that it was important there be an apolitical judiciary, charging Chase with misusing his judicial position to advance his own political beliefs. Campbell argued that Chase's, "justiciar authority was prostituted to party purposes." Campbell also argued that political grand jury charges were unreconcilable with the ideal of judicial independent as they tarnished the impartiality of judges.

After Early and Campbell, Christopher H. Clark spoke briefly. His remarks were focused on the fifth and sixth articles, which pertained to the Callender trial.

Defense's presentation
In the defense's presentation, which took four days, it was argued that the constitution only intended impeachment to be for charges related to accusations of a civil officer having committed an indictable crime. It began with remarks by Robert Goodloe Harper on February 15, 1805. The defense called 32 witnesses in their presentation.

John Hopkinson argued an interpretation of the Constitutional prescription for impeachment being allowed for 'treason, bribery, or other high crimes and misdemeanors' that, under the constitution, "No judge can be impeached and removed from office for any act or offense for which he could not be indicted." He argued that Congress could not, on their own accord, decide what constituted impeachable conduct, but rather, had to heed this interpretation of the Constitution. He declared that while the House of impeachment, "had the power of impeachment", that, "what they are to impeach  in what cases they may exercise this delegated power depends on...the Constitution, and not on their opinion, whim, or caprice." He outlined an argument for the value of an independent judiciary, and further argued that removal for the circumstances that Chase was being impeached for would undermine judicial independence, asking,

Historian Adam A. Perlin accused the House-appointed impeachment managers of seeking to expand the ability of Congress to, "create offenses at their will and pleasure," and argued that a conviction of Chase would lead to Congress being able to remove judges for purely political purposes.   

On February 19, 1805, during the defense's presentation, Burr granted Chase permission to cease personal attendance at the trial as Chase began to suffer a painful case of gout.

After John Hopkinson's presentation, Philip Barton Key and Charles Lee next spoke on February 22, 1805. On February 23, 1805, Luther Martin spoke. In his remarks, Luther Martin, who had been a delegate to United States Constitutional Convention himself, declared,  

Martin defended Chase's conduct in the Fries trial and the Callender trial. Martin defended some of the specific behavior of Chase's that had been under attack by the prosecution. He justified Chase's judicial conduct in the Callender trial, including examining the Sedition law that was in question itself. Martin conceded that Chase had, occasionally, been overly influenced by his personal emotions, but argued that this behavior was, 

Martin argued that impeachment was being used in a partisan manner, which threatened the integrity of the judiciary by placing it under discipline by a political party.

Closing remarks
The closing remarks began on February 20, 1805, and lasted for eight days. During the closing remarks, the House impeachment managers spoke both first and last, with the defense giving remarks in between.

Robert Goodloe Harper gave the closing remarks of the defense's presentation. In his remarks, he argued, 

Harper also brought attention to the impeachment managers' approach of presenting contradictory arguments: first arguing that they needed to prove nothing, then proceeding to try to present proof of an impeachable crime. He argued that, on one hand the managers at once, argued, "that this is a merely a question of policy and expedience," and also cited, "legal authorities, both English and American, for the purpose of explaining the doctrine of impeachment, and of proving that the acts alleged against the respondent amount to impeachable offenses". This is a criticism that was never directly responded to by the impeachment managers.

Nicholson, Randolph, and Rodney gave the closing remarks for the prosecution. Despite being sick the day before and having lost his prepared notes, Randolph personally spoke for two and one-half hours in the closing remarks.

Randolph argued, "[Chase] stands charged with having sinned against his law and against his sacred oath, by acting in his judicial capacity unfaithfully, partially, and with respect to persons."

The Senate thereafter resolved to reconvene on March 1, 1805 as a court of impeachment to give their judgement.

Verdict

The Senate convened on March 1, 1805 to vote on verdicts for each of the articles. The galleries of the Senate were filled with many spectators who witnessed the Senate's deliberations.

With 25 members, the Democratic–Republicans had enough votes on their own to hypothetically convict Chase. However, the Senate voted to acquit Chase of all charges, with each articles seeing at least six Democratic–Republican senators joining all Federalist senators in voting to acquit.

There were 34 senators (25 Democratic-Republicans and 9 Federalists). Therefore, with all senators voting, 23 "guilty" votes were needed to reach the required two-thirds majority for conviction/removal from office. Ultimately, the article that received the most guilty votes (Article VIII) still fell four votes short of a two-thirds majority for conviction.

The vote on a verdict began at 12:30pm. For each vote, Vice President Burr individually asked each senator in a roll call vote, "Mr. _, how say you; is the respondent, Samuel Chase, guilty or not guilty of a high crime or misdemeanor as charged in the _ article of impeachment?" The Senators each responded by casting a vote of either "guilty" or "not guilty".

After the voting concluded, Burr recited each count before declaring, 

No senator made any floor remarks to the Senate explaining the reasons for their vote. This differs from more modern U.S. federal impeachment trials, in which senators often deliver speeches after the close of the trial.

Aftermath

Immediate aftermath
Chase remained on the court until his June 1811 death. The acquittal of Chase handed a political defeat to Thomas Jefferson. Jefferson would have possibly moved next to impeach Chief Justice John Marshall had the Senate convicted Chase.

The failure of the Democratic–Republicans in the United States Congress to remove Chase followed the failure of the Democratic–Republicans to remove all three Federalist justices of the  Pennsylvania Supreme Court (Edward Shippen IV and Thomas Smith, Jasper Yeates) that had been similarly impeached on political grounds on March 23, 1804 Democratic–Republican-led Pennsylvania House of Representatives but acquitted in their impeachment trial before the Pennsylvania Senate in the vote held on January 28, 1805. Not willing to surrender defeat, some Democratic–Republicans in both the federal government and state judiciaries turned their attention to amending their constitutions. John Randolph of Roanoke appeared on the House floor the very afternoon to propose and amendment to the United States Constitution that would allow the president, upon the request of both Houses of congress, to remove any federal judge. Joseph Hopper Nicholson proposed a Constitutional amendment that would allow for state legislatures to recall (remove) senators for any reason. In the Pennsylvania state legislature, amendments to the state constitution were proposed that would allow judges to be removed by a simple majority vote, make the threshold for an impeachment conviction a simple majority, and have judges hold terms of years rather than lifetime appointments. A major issue of the 1805 Pennsylvania gubernatorial election would be the prospect of a holding a state constitutional convention.

Legacy
Chase is the only U.S. Supreme Court justice that has ever been impeached.

The acquittal of Chase—by lopsided margins on several counts—set an unofficial precedent that many historians say helped ensure the independence of the judiciary. As Chief Justice William Rehnquist noted in his book Grand Inquests, some senators declined to convict Chase despite their partisan hostility to him, apparently because they doubted that the mere quality of his judging was grounds for removal. All impeachments of federal judges since Chase have been based on allegations of legal or ethical misconduct, not on judicial performance. For their part, federal judges since that time have generally been much more cautious than Chase in trying to avoid the appearance of political partisanship.

The impeachment raised constitutional questions over the nature of the judiciary and was the end of a series of efforts to define the appropriate extent of judicial independence under the Constitution. It set the unofficial limits of the impeachment power, fixed the concept that the judiciary was prohibited from engaging in partisan politics, defined the role of the judge in a criminal jury trial, and clarified judicial independence. The construction was largely attitudinal, as it modified political norms without codifying new legal doctrines.

Viewing the trial's outcome protected the independence of the judiciary.

While the impeachment was a major event at the time it took place, it has since been relegated to relative historical obscurity in both the general public consciousness and even in terms of scholarly coverage.

References

Sources cited

Chase, Samuel
Chase, Samuel
Chase, Samuel
Impeachment Chase, Samuel
Impeachment Chase, Samuel
Impeachment Chase, Samuel
Impeachment Chase, Samuel
Impeachment trial Chase, Samuel
Impeachment trial Chase, Samuel
Aaron Burr